Slobodka is a rural locality (a selo) in Yenangskoye Rural Settlement, Kichmengsko-Gorodetsky District, Vologda Oblast, Russia. The population was 64 as of 2002.

Geography 
Slobodka is located 41 km east of Kichmengsky Gorodok (the district's administrative centre) by road. Rybino is the nearest rural locality.

References 

Rural localities in Kichmengsko-Gorodetsky District